Anil Wanvari (born 1963) is an Indian media entrepreneur who is the founder, CEO & editor-in-chief of the Indiantelevision.com group, which he set up in 1999. He is a journalist-cum-observer-specialist covering the Indian advertising, marketing, cable TV, satellite TV, terrestrial television and OTT ecosystems.

He has been the driving force behind the group which has the following publications under its umbrella: Indiantelevision.com, Tellychakkar.com, Radioandmusic.com, AnimationXpress.

Wanvari has also been instrumental in creating properties such as The Indian Telly Awards and The NT Awards. He has been the producer of indiantelevision.com's The Indian Telly Awards which has been televised on general entertainment channels like Star Plus, Sony, Colors and &TV over the years. The NT Awards has been telecast on news channels. He is also a member of the New York-based International Academy of Television Arts & Sciences.

As India, Pakistan, Bangladesh and Sri Lanka representative of Reed Midem's MIPCOM, MipTV, MipCancun, Midem, MipChina and MIPIM, Asia Television Forum markets he advises clients on how to expand internationally.

Personal and professional life 

Anil Wanvari is the third of four sons of Moolchand Thakurdas Wanvari (1932-2020), an Indian businessman who migrated to India during the partition, and Neelam Wanvari (1938–2009), a homemaker. He did his master's degree in cytogenetics and plant breeding from Bombay University's Ramnarain Ruia College in 1987, after attaining his BSc in Botany from Mumbai's Jai Hind College and getting the highest marks in his class in 1983–84.

Following his masters, he did a diploma in journalism and mass communications from Mumbai's Xavier Institute of Communications in 1988.

He then went on to work for publications such as the Western India Automobile Association's (WIAA's) Motoring magazine and followed it with a six-year stint at then India's number one business news fortnightly – BusinessWorld magazine, where he rose from sub-editor to Assistant Editor in just five years. He wrote on everything from entrepreneurship to technology to banking and finance to stock markets to media, advertising, marketing and brands to management practices in the corporate world. After a successful six-year stint at BusinessWorld, he went on to pen columns on the world of internet, telecommunications, and technology and media, advertising and marketing for Indian financial daily FinancialExpress. He also wrote a column on the media business for Business Standard for a couple of years.

Simultaneously, given his incisive knowledge of the media business, he was appointed India correspondent for Hong Kong-based Asian Advertising  & Marketing magazine and the FT Media group's publications Television Business International, Cable Business International, Cable & Satellite Europe and Cable & Satellite Asia. He covered the rapidly exploding advertising, marketing, media, cable, satellite and satellite TV industries for these publications extremely effectively and efficiently for around five years.

He also wrote on the Indian management and corporate behaviour for World's Executive Digest, Philippines.

His elder brothers first Anoop Wanvari and later Tarachand Wanvari have been a part of the Indiantelevision.com group for more than a decade. Anoop has played a key role in raising the group's revenues while Tarachand has been pursuing writing some of the more financially astute reports on the performance of the major Indian listed media and entertainment companies on indiantelevision.com.

Anil Wanvari role has evolved into being that of a catalyst for the television, streaming, radio, music, animation, VFX, gaming and comics industries. He does that through ITV 2.0 Productions – a division of Indian Television Dot Com and AnimationXpress Dot Com – by setting up thought leadership platforms like Vidnet, VBS, The Content Hub, the MediaHR Summit, The Film Editors Summit, BrandVid, Kids, Animation & More Summit, TeleWise – The Power of Television.

References

Living people
1963 births